Poljanice may refer to:

 Poljanice, Travnik, a village in Bosnia and Herzegovina
 Poljanice (Višegrad), a village in Bosnia and Herzegovina
 Poljanice (Ljig), a village near Ljig, Serbia
 Poljanice, a hamlet in the municipality of Bečej, Serbia
 Poljanice, a section of Donja Dubrava, Zagreb, Croatia